The ongoing drought starting in 2015 affecting the Eastern Cape region of South Africa is one of the worst droughts in the region's history. The drought led the South African government to declare the region a "disaster area" in October 2019. A local hydrologist, Gideon Groenewald, has stated that it could be the worst drought the area as experienced in one thousand years and has had serious negative socioeconomic impacts on the region. Heavy rains in 2019 were not enough to break the drought. Reasons cited for the severity of the drought include poor water management by local government, unpredictable rainfall patterns and vandalism of local infrastructure. Areas of the Eastern Cape that overlap with the Karroo, such as the area around Graaff-Reinet, have been especially badly hit. The drought took place at the same time as the Cape Town water crisis.

See also
2018–21 Southern Africa drought

References 

Climate of South Africa
Droughts in Africa
2021 in South Africa
2020 in South Africa
2019 in South Africa
2018 in South Africa
2017 in South Africa
2016 in South Africa
2015 in South Africa 
2015 disasters in South Africa
2021 disasters in South Africa
2010s disasters in South Africa 
2020s disasters in South Africa 
2021 in the environment
2020 in the environment
2019 in the environment
2018 in the environment
2017 in the environment
2016 in the environment
2015 in the environment
2021 droughts
2020 droughts
2019 droughts
2018 droughts
2017 droughts
2016 droughts
2015 droughts
Climate change in South Africa
Water scarcity